Wait 'til This Year is a reality-type docu-drama film which follows a Boston Red Sox fan during the 2004 baseball season, when the team ended their famous losing streak by winning the World Series.
The film was aired on New England Sports Network (NESN) and then released on DVD afterward.
Monika Lahiri starred (as the "character" Monika) and produced the film, which combines reality, documentary and scripted scenes when following the events from the perspective of Monika.

In the film Monika and her husband Jes (played by Ges Selmont) are diehard Sox fans.  Friends Rob and Alex, have a conflict, because one is a Yankees fan, and one a Sox fan.

Cast
The "cast" includes those playing scripted fictional roles, while also including persons who appear as themselves, such former Red Sox star players, who made cameo appearances as themselves.
Monika Lahiri - Monika, lead character and wife of Jes.
Ges Selmont - Ges, husband of Monika.
Chris Kies	- Rob, a Sox fan, and friend of Alex.
Stephen Kunken - Alex, a Yankees fan, and friend of Rob.
Rich Coppola - Himself, TV sports director at Connecticut's WTIC FOX 61 
Tony Terzi - Himself, sports reporter 
Jim Rice - Himself, former Sox player.
Dwight Evans - Himself, former Sox player.
Bill Lee - Himself, a former Sox player 
Carl Yastrzemski - Himself, former Sox player.
Julie Dubela - Herself, national anthem singer

References

2004 films
2000s sports films
American baseball films
Films set in Massachusetts
Boston Red Sox
Films shot in Boston
2000s English-language films
2000s American films